Diana Hamilton was a British stage actress and playwright. Born Lalla Hamilton she married the actor and playwright Sutton Vane in 1922, and the following year starred in his breakthrough play Outward Bound in the West End. The following year she starred in Vane's Falling Leaves. Other West End appearances included Edward Knoblock's Mumsie and Somerset Maugham's For Services Rendered in 1932. In 1933 she acted in Before Sunset, Miles Malleson's  English-language version of the German play Vor Sonnenaufgang by Gerhart Hauptmann. She later wrote or co-wrote several stage plays.

She was the sister of the writer Patrick Hamilton, whose career was boosted by an early recommendation by his brother-in-law Sutton Vane.

References

Bibliography
 Harding, John. Patrick Hamilton: His Life and Work : a Critical Study. Greenwich Exchange, 2007.
 Wearing, J. P. The London Stage 1920-1929: A Calendar of Productions, Performers, and Personnel. Rowman & Littlefield, 2014.

External links

Year of death unknown
Year of birth unknown
British stage actresses
British women writers